HD 108541, also known by its Bayer designation u Centauri is a star located in the constellation Centaurus, It is also known as HR 4748. The apparent magnitude of the star is about 5.4, meaning it is only visible to the naked eye under excellent viewing conditions. Its distance is about 440 light-years (140 parsecs), based on its parallax measured by the Hipparcos astrometry satellite. The spectral type of HD 108541 is B8/9V, meaning it is a late B-type main sequence star. These types of stars are a few times more massive than the Sun, and have effective temperatures of about 10,000 to 30,000 K. HD 108541 is just under 3 times more massive than the Sun and has a temperature of about 11,000 K.

References 

Centaurus (constellation)
B-type main-sequence stars
Centauri, u
108541
4748
060855
Durchmusterung objects